Ishidatrechus is a genus of beetles in the family Carabidae, containing the following species:

 Ishidatrechus jianensis Li & Chea, 1990
 Ishidatrechus nitidus Ueno, 1956

References

Trechinae